Juan Bucetta (20 March 1927 – 19 December 2017) was a Uruguayan water polo player. He competed in the men's tournament at the 1948 Summer Olympics.

References

External links
 

1927 births
2017 deaths
Uruguayan male water polo players
Olympic water polo players of Uruguay
Water polo players at the 1948 Summer Olympics
Sportspeople from Montevideo